The men's cycling team sprint at the 2012 Olympic Games in London took place at the London Velopark on 2 August.

The Great Britain team consisting of Philip Hindes, Chris Hoy and Jason Kenny won the gold medal in world record-breaking time. Grégory Bauge, Michaël D'Almeida and Kévin Sireau from France took silver, and the bronze medal was won by Germany's René Enders, Maximilian Levy and Robert Förstemann.

Competition format

A men's team sprint race consists of a three-lap race between two teams of three cyclists, starting on opposite sides of the track.  Each member of the team must lead for one of the laps.

The tournament consisted of an initial qualifying round.  The top eight teams advanced to the first round.  The first round comprised head-to-head races based on seeding (1st vs. 8th, 2nd vs. 7th, etc.). The winners of those four heats advanced to the medal round, with the two fastest winners competing in the gold medal final and the two slower winners facing off for bronze.

Great Britain's team consisting of Philip Hindes, Chris Hoy and Jason Kenny won the gold medal with a time of 42.6 seconds, breaking the world record. France won the silver medal and Germany took bronze.

Schedule 
All times are British Summer Time.

Results

Qualification

First round

Finals

Bronze medal final

Gold medal final

References

Track cycling at the 2012 Summer Olympics
Cycling at the Summer Olympics – Men's team sprint
Men's events at the 2012 Summer Olympics